Aurel Leli Demo (born 20 October 1996) is an Albanian footballer who most recently played for Luftëtari Gjirokastër in the Albanian Superliga.  He plays as a defender.

Career

Panegialios F.C.
Demo came up through the youth system at Panegialios, and he made his senior league debut for the club on 30 October 2016 in a 0-0 home draw with AO Chania F.C.

Luftëtari Gjirokastër
In January 2018, Demo was sold to Luftëtari Gjirokastër for an undisclosed transfer fee. He made his league debut for the club on 18 February 2018 in a 2-2 away draw with KF Laçi. He was subbed on in the 70th minute for Bruno Nicolás Toledo Dante. He scored his first competitive goal for the club on 16 December 2018 in a 3-2 away victory in the league over Skënderbeu Korçë. His goal, scored in the 11th minute, leveled the scores at a goal each.

References

External links

1996 births
Living people
People from Kuçovë
Association football defenders
Albanian footballers
Panegialios F.C. players
Luftëtari Gjirokastër players
Kategoria Superiore players
Albanian expatriate footballers
Expatriate footballers in Greece
Albanian expatriate sportspeople in Greece